Dedicated to Dolphy is an album by the American jazz saxophonist Oliver Lake, recorded in 1994 for the Italian Black Saint label. The album is Lake's second tribute to multi-instrumentalist Eric Dolphy following Prophet (1984).

Reception
The AllMusic review by Ken Dryden described the album as: "An excellent salute to Dolphy with a couple of strong Lake originals thrown in for good measure".

Track listing
All compositions by Eric Dolphy, except as indicated
 "Fire Waltz" (Mal Waldron) - 7:04 
 "Hat and Beard" - 4:10 
 "Feather" (Hale Smith) - 5:49 
 "245" - 8:19 
 "Miss Ann" - 6:21 
 "Something Sweet, Something Tender" - 5:39 
 "November '80" (Oliver Lake) - 2:18 
 "Page Four" (Lake) - 6:34 
 "G.W." - 8:30 
Recorded at East Side Sound in New York City on November 1, 2 and 8, 1994

Personnel
Oliver Lake - alto saxophone
Russel Gunn - trumpet
Charles Eubanks - piano
Belden Bullock - bass
Cecil Brooks III- drums

References

 

Black Saint/Soul Note albums
Oliver Lake albums
1996 albums